Crimson is a rich, deep red color.

Crimson may also refer to:

Arts, entertainment and media

Fictional entities
Crimson (comics), several uses
Crimson, a character from The Ridonculous Race
 The Crimson, from the 2011 video game Terraria

Film and television
 Crimson (2020 film), directed by Gregory Plotkin
"Crimson", an episode of Smallville (season 6)

Literature
 Crimson (Sata novel), 1936/1938 novel by Ineko Sata
 Homo Sapienne, published in English as Crimson, a 2014 work by Niviaq Korneliussen
 Crimson, a 1992 novel by Shirley Conran
 Crimson (comic book), a 1998 comic book series 
The Crimson, the student-run university newspaper of Florida Institute of Technology
The Harvard Crimson, the student newspaper of Harvard University

Music 
Crimson (band), an American Christian metal band
Crimson (Alkaline Trio album), 2005
Crimson (Code Red album), 2001
Crimson (Edge of Sanity album), 1996
Crimson (Nanase Aikawa album), 1998
Crimson (Sentenced album), 2000
Crimson (Akina Nakamori album), 1986Crimson 3.x, by VAST, 2003
"Crimson", a song by Erra from Augment, 2013
"The Crimson", a song by Atreyu from The Curse, 2004
Crimson Records, an American record label

Computing and softwareCrimson'', a Java XML parser, part of Apache XML Project
Crimson Editor, a freeware text editor
SGI Crimson, a Silicon Graphics computer

Other uses
Crimson (wrestler) (Anthony Gregory Mayweather, born 1985), American professional wrestler 
Harvard Crimson, the intercollegiate athletic teams of Harvard College
Crimson, the code name for Canada in the U.S.'s interwar War Plan Red

See also

Krimson, a Flemish comic book character